Taste receptor, type 2, member 31, also known as TAS2R31, is a protein which in humans is encoded by the TAS2R31 gene. This bitter taste receptor has been shown to respond to saccharin in vitro.

TAS2R31 is also expressed in the smooth muscle of human airways, along with several other bitter taste receptors. Their activation in these cells causes an increase in intracellular calcium ion, which in turn triggers the opening of potassium channels which hyperpolarize the membrane and cause the smooth muscle to relax. Hence, activation of these receptors leads to bronchodilation.

Polymorphisms in this gene have been associated with the perceived bitterness of sweetener acesulfame potassium.

See also
 Taste receptor

References

Further reading

Human taste receptors